The 2007 Euroseries 3000 season was the ninth Euro Formula 3000 season. Both series were won by Italian Davide Rigon who would go on to win the 2008 Superleague Formula season and compete in GP2.

Teams and drivers

Race calendar
Rounds denoted with a blue background are a part of the Italian Formula 3000 Championship.

Championship Standings
 Points for both championships are awarded as follows:

In addition:
 One point will be awarded for Pole position for Race One
 One point will be awarded for fastest lap in each race

Drivers

F3000 Italian Championship

Teams

F3000 Italian Championship

References

External links
Official Euroseries 3000 site
Reference: 
Reference: 

Auto GP
Euroseries 3000
Euroseries 3000
Euroseries 3000